Hessam Abrishami (born 1951) is an Iranian-born American artist, he works in multiple media including painting and sculpture. He currently lives in Fort Lauderdale, Florida; and has previously lived in Los Angeles, California; Perugia, Italy; and Shiraz, Iran.

Biography 
Hessam Abrishami was born December 30, 1951, in Shiraz, Iran. He grew up in a middle class family, and was one of 8 children. He started painting at age 15, attending college to study art in Iran. Abrishami continued his studies and attended the Accademia di Belle Arti di Perugia in Italy, where he received a master's degree. In 1984, he moved to the United States.

Abrishami frequently works in acrylic painting and bronze sculpture, making abstract work. Themes of his work include love, romanticism and self realization. He has exhibited in more than 30 countries internationally, including in Europe and Asia.

Publications

References

External links 

Official Site

Living people
Iranian emigrants to the United States
1951 births
Iranian painters
20th-century Iranian sculptors
21st-century Iranian sculptors
People from Shiraz